Wildensee is a lake in Styria in the Salzkammergut resort region. The lake is about 1,535 metres above sea level in the Totes Gebirge mountains.

Lakes of Styria
Totes Gebirge